Lipogya is a genus of moths in the family Geometridae described by Warren in 1898. All are from Australia.

Species
Lipogya exprimataria (Walker, [1863])
Lipogya capnota (Meyrick, 1892)
Lipogya leucoprosopa (Turner, 1947)
Lipogya eutheta (Turner, 1917)

References

Geometridae